The Autism Genetic Resource Exchange (AGRE) is a DNA biobank funded by Autism Speaks. It exists to provide DNA specimens to geneticists who are researching autism.

History
Autism Speaks funds the Autism Genetic Resource Exchange (AGRE), a DNA repository and family registry of genotypic and phenotypic information that is available to autism researchers worldwide. The AGRE was established in the 1990s by a predecessor organization, Cure Autism Now.

Cure Autism Now was a Los Angeles-based non-profit organization founded in 1995 by Jonathan Shestack and Portia Iversen, the parents of a child with autism whose story is told in the book Strange Son. It was an organization of parents, doctors and scientists devoted to research to prevent, treat and cure autism. In 1997 Cure Autism Now established AGRE despite initial resistance from scientists to begin a project which conflicted with existing practices.

Projects
In October 2011 AGRE announced a plan to create the world's largest library of sequenced human genomes of individuals with autism-related genes, representing 2000 families and 10000 individuals.  To do this, AGRE will provide specimens to the Beijing Genomics Institute, who will perform the sequencing.

References

External links

Human genome projects
Biobank organizations